University Park is a station on Metra's Metra Electric District line located in University Park, Illinois. The station is located on South Governor's Highway near West Stuenkel Road.

University Park station is located at grade level. The station consists of one island platform which serves two tracks; Canadian National tracks (ex-Illinois Central) parallel the Metra Electric tracks. The station has an unstaffed waiting room with a ticket vending machine. Parking is available at the station.

Station layout

University Park has an underground mezzanine containing ticket vending machines as well as parking token machines. The platform serves two tracks. Both tracks continue into the yard, however, due to the frequency of the Metra Electric District, most trains do not continue into the yard. On the platform, two 24/7 shelters are available. Trains board on both sides of the platform, however, most trains departing to Chicago board from the inbound side.

Bus connections
Pace
 367 University Park

River Valley Metro
 University Park Commuter Routes 1 and 2

References

External links

Train at University Park Station (Metra Railfan Photos)
Pictures of University Park Metra Station and Train Yard (Flickr)
Station from Google Maps Street View
University Park Station Entrance from Google Maps Street View

Metra stations in Illinois
Railway stations in the United States opened in 1977
Railway stations in Will County, Illinois